Ramma Waduge Dumila Dedunu (born 1 March 1979) is a former Sri Lankan woman cricketer. She has played for Sri Lanka in four World One Day Internationals.

References

External links 

1979 births
Living people
Sri Lankan women cricketers
Sri Lanka women One Day International cricketers
Colts Cricket Club cricketers